Novinky.cz is a Czech news website established in 1998. As of 2008, it was the most visited news website in the country, along with the server iDnes. As of 2010 and 2011, it was the most visited news server in the Czech Republic. Novinky.cz is an online news magazine of the Czech daily Právo and a section of the internet portal Seznam.cz.

References

External links
 Official website

Czech news websites
1998 establishments in the Czech Republic
Seznam.cz